Antônio Delfino de Souza (born 11 August 1971) is a retired paralympic sprinter from Brazil. At the age of 17 de Souza had his right hand amputated after an accident at agricultural works. In 1992, he moved to Brasília, where he took up sprint running. He competed in T46 sprint events at the 2000, 2004, 2008 and 2012 Paralympics and won two gold and one silver medal in 2000 and 2004. He was selected as a final Paralympic torch bearer at the 2016 Summer Paralympics opening ceremony.

References

External links

 

1971 births
Living people
Brazilian male sprinters
Paralympic athletes of Brazil
Paralympic gold medalists for Brazil
Paralympic silver medalists for Brazil
Paralympic medalists in athletics (track and field)
Athletes (track and field) at the 2000 Summer Paralympics
Athletes (track and field) at the 2004 Summer Paralympics
Athletes (track and field) at the 2008 Summer Paralympics
Athletes (track and field) at the 2012 Summer Paralympics
Medalists at the 2000 Summer Paralympics
Medalists at the 2004 Summer Paralympics
Medalists at the 2007 Parapan American Games
Sprinters with limb difference
Paralympic sprinters
21st-century Brazilian people